Chorus Paulinus is the album of the Chorus Paulinus recorded at the Performing Arts Center, San Luis Obispo, California, United States.

Track listing 
 Disc 1
 "Anima Christi" - Ryan Cayabyab (6:50)
 "O Magnum Mysterium" - M. Lauridsen (6:27)
 "Lead, Me Lord" - G. Paraiso, arranged by R. Delgado
 "The Battle of Jericho" - arranged by M. Hogan
 "La Guerre" - C. Janequin (5:58)
 "Con Te Partiro" - F. Sartori/arranged by C. Tapnio (4:33)
 "Duerme Negrito" - A. Yupanqui/arranged by E. Sole (3:30)
  "Shenandoah" - arranged J. Erb (4:17)
  "Makendonska Humoreska" - arranged by Todor Skalovski (3:15)
 Disc 2
  "Pobreng Alindahaw" - arranged by T. Regalario (2:51)
  "Iyo Kailan Pa Man" - A. Pena /arranged by R. Federizon (4:26)
  "Beh! Buti Nga" - arranged by A. Nepomuceno (2:02)
  "Ikaw" - George Canseco/L. Ocampo/arranged by Arnold Zamora (5:16)
  "Paraiso" - Ryan Cayabyab/arranged by JC Merino (4:03)
  "With You" - S. Schwartz/arranged by F. de Santos (3:28)
  "Man in the Mirror" - M.Jackson/arranged by C. Tapnio(4:07)
  "I Believe I Can Fly" - R. Kelly/arranged by C. Tapnio (5:06)
  "'70's Medley" - arranged by D. Francisco (8:14)
  "Let It Be" - J. Lennon/arranged by Ryan Cayabyab (5:00)
  "Do That To Me" - arranged by C. Tapnio (5:02)
  "Cat's Meow" - G. Rossini (4:28)

Credits 
 Recorded by: Roger M. Phillip
 Mastered by: Mike Leahy
 Produced by: Mike Soliman

2001 classical albums
Chorus Paulinus albums